Dragoljub Acković (born 1952) is a writer, academic, activist, and politician in Serbia. He is a prominent member of the Roma community in Serbia and has written extensively on the history and identity of the Roma people. Acković has served in the National Assembly of Serbia since 2020 as a member of the Serbian Progressive Party.

Early life and academic career
Acković was born in the village of Osipaonica, Smederevo, in what was then the People's Republic of Serbia in the Federal People's Republic of Yugoslavia. He attained university degrees in political science and ethnology, took post-graduate studies at the University of Belgrade Faculty of Law, and received a doctorate in Romological studies from the United Nations University for Peace.

Author and community activist
Acković has written around twenty books and several hundred articles on the Roma community. His book Roma in Belgrade focuses on the history of the Roma community in Serbia's capital; in this work, he notes that Roma have lived in the city since at least 1328 and contends that there was no prejudice between Serbs and Roma over a period of many centuries. The work also addresses contemporary discrimination against the Roma community and argues for improved access to education as a means of breaking down modern prejudices.

He joined the Association of Writers of Serbia in 1997 and also has been a member of the Commission for the Study of Roma Life and Customs in the Serbian Academy of Sciences and Arts (Srpska akademija nauka i umetnosti, SANU). In 2011, he became deputy president of the International Roma Academy of Arts and Sciences and a member of the National Committee for Intangible Culture Heritage in the Serbian ministry of culture, information, and informational society. He has also worked as the editor for Roma programming at Radio Belgrade for more than twenty years, was the founder and director of the museum of Roma culture in Belgrade and the radio station Khrlo e Romengo, and has started numerous other media initiatives in the Romani language.

In September 2012, he became deputy director of Serbia's office for human and minority rights. In 2020, he was involved in efforts to reduce the spread of COVID-19 among members of the Roma community.

Acković became a member of the International Commission for the Truth About Jasenovac in 2007. Three years later, he became president of Milan Bulajić's Genocide Research Fund. In 2018, he curated an exhibition entitled, "Suffering of Roma in the First World War" at the Museum of Vojvodina.

Politician and representative

Roma political organizations
Acković was the first president of the Roma Congress Party. He has been active with the World Romani Congress since its third convention in 1981 and was elected as its president in April 2013. In the latter capacity, he condemned increasing attacks on Roma people in Europe and around the world.

He has also served on Serbia's Roma National Council; he appeared at the head of his own electoral list in the 2014 council elections and was elected when the list won two out of thirty-five seats. He did not seek re-election in 2018.

Republic of Serbia
Acković was a Social Democracy candidate for the national assembly of Serbia in the 1997 Serbian parliamentary election, appearing in second place on the party's list in Čukarica. The list did not win any seats in the division. This was the last election in Serbia at the republic level where the country was divided into separate electoral constituencies.

Acković encouraged Roma people in Kosovo to support the Serb Civic Initiative in the 2013 Kosovan local elections.

He received the 191st position on the Progressive Party's Let's Get Serbia Moving list in the 2012 Serbian parliamentary election. The list won seventy-three mandates, and he was not returned. He was subsequently given the 165th position on the party's Aleksandar Vučić — For Our Children list in the 2020 parliamentary election and was elected to the assembly when the list won a landslide majority with 188 out of 250 mandates.

Acković is now the deputy chair of the assembly committee on human and minority rights and gender equality, a member of the committee of labour, social issues, social inclusion, and poverty reduction, a member of Serbia's delegation to the parliamentary assembly of the Francophonie, and a member of Serbia's parliamentary friendship groups with France, India, and Russia.

References

1952 births
Living people
Politicians from Smederevo
Politicians from Belgrade
Serbian Romani people
Members of the National Assembly (Serbia)
Members of the Roma National Council (Serbia)
Members of the Parliamentary Assembly of the Francophonie
Social Democracy (Serbia) politicians
Serbian Progressive Party politicians
Writers from Smederevo